The 1920 Mercer Baptists football team was an American football team that represented  Mercer University as a member of the Southern Intercollegiate Athletic Association (SIAA) during the 1920 college football season. In their first season under head coach Josh Cody, Mercer compiled a 2–7 record.

Schedule

References

Mercer
Mercer Bears football seasons
Mercer Baptists football